Double Speed is a lost 1920 American silent comedy-drama film produced by Famous Players-Lasky and distributed by Paramount Pictures. It was the debut directorial effort of Sam Wood and starred Wallace Reid in another of his racing car films.

Plot
As described in a film magazine, Speed Carr (Reid), driving from New York to Los Angeles to visit an uncle he has not seen in twenty years, is robbed of his car, clothing, and credentials by tramps and reaches the coast penniless wearing a borrowed suit of clothes. At his uncle's bank he is refused money. Carr pawns his watch under the name Barry Cole and, adopting this name, secures a position as chauffeur for Donald McPherson (Marshall), father of Sallie McPherson (Hawley), with whom he has fallen in love. After they elope, he reveals his identity and his uncle appears to give his blessing.

Cast
Wallace Reid as 'Speed' Carr
Wanda Hawley as Sallie McPherson
Theodore Roberts as John Ogden
Tully Marshall as Donald McPherson
Lucien Littlefield as Reginald Toby
Guy Oliver as Pawn Broker
Maxine Elliott Hicks
Teddy Tetzlaff as Race Car Driver

See also
Wallace Reid filmography

References

External links

1920 films
American silent feature films
Films directed by Sam Wood
Lost American films
Films based on short fiction
1920 lost films
1920 comedy-drama films
American auto racing films
American black-and-white films
1920 directorial debut films
1920s American films
1920s English-language films
Silent American comedy-drama films